Excel is a line of chewing gum and mints available in Canada since 1991. It is produced by the Wrigley Company. Eclipse is the American version of Excel.

During the 2010 Winter Olympics in Vancouver, Canada, each piece of gum had a small edible maple leaf printed on to support the Canadian Olympic Team. In partnership with Chinese Stomatological Association in 2012, Excel released the first dental health app in China; Ai Ya Qing Song Xue (爱牙轻松学), developed by FabriQate.

See also
 List of breath mints
 List of chewing gum brands

References

Brand name confectionery
Breath mints
Canadian confectionery
Chewing gum
Products introduced in 1991
Wrigley Company brands